Paradicula setifer is a species of sole known only from the Pacific coast of Australia.  This species is the only known member of its genus.

References
 

Soleidae
Fish described in 1927
Fish of Australia